East Africans in the United States are Americans with ancestry from East Africa. They include:

Eritrean Americans
Ethiopian Americans
Kenyan Americans
Somali Americans
History of Somali Bantus in Maine
South Sudanese Americans
Sudanese Americans
Tanzanian Americans
Ugandan Americans

See also
 African Great Lakes

East African people